La Chapelle-Agnon is a commune in the Puy-de-Dôme department in Auvergne-Rhône-Alpes in central France.

The commune of La Chapelle-Agnon is adherent to Parc naturel régional Livradois-Forez (Livradois-Forez Regional Nature Park)

See also
Communes of the Puy-de-Dôme department

References

Chapelleagnon